Heinrich "Heino" Thielemann (3 October 1923 – 24 August 2015) was a German field hockey player who competed in the 1952 Summer Olympics.

References

External links
 

1923 births
2015 deaths
German male field hockey players
Olympic field hockey players of Germany
Field hockey players at the 1952 Summer Olympics